Ophichthus leonensis is an eel in the family Ophichthidae (worm/snake eels). It was described by Jacques Blache. It is presumed to form burrows in sand or mud, as is common amongst eels.

References

leonensis
Fish described in 1975